Mere Apne is a 1971 Indian Hindi-language film written and directed by Gulzar and produced by Romu, Raj and N. C. Sippy. It was Gulzar's first directorial venture and was almost a frame by frame remake of the National Award-winning Bengali film Apanjan, which was directed by Tapan Sinha. This was the first movie of Vinod Khanna as Hero. This was also debut movie of Danny. The film stars Meena Kumari, Vinod Khanna and Shatrughan Sinha in lead roles along with Deven Verma, Paintal, Asit Sen, Asrani, Danny Denzongpa, Keshto Mukherjee, A. K. Hangal, Dinesh Thakur, Mehmood and Yogeeta Bali. The music of the film is composed by Salil Choudhury.

Mere Apne was declared " Hit " at the box office.

Plot 
Anandi Devi (Meena Kumari) is an old widow who lives in a village. One day, she is visited by a distant relative, Arun Gupta (Ramesh Deo), who persuades her to live in town with him, his wife Lata (Sumita Sanyal), and a small child. She later realizes that they were looking for a maid, which results in her expulsion from the house and befriending a child beggar who takes her to his dilapidated home. Being good-natured and caring, she slowly earns the title of "Nani Ma" (maternal grandmother) among groups of youths led by Shyam (Vinod Khanna) and Chhenu (Shatrughan Sinha), who were in a constant fight with each other. The movie ends with her death from accidental gunfire in one such response.

Cast 
Meena Kumari as Anandi Devi
Vinod Khanna as Shyam
Shatrughan Sinha as Chhenu
Deven Verma as Niranjan, Anandi's deceased husband
Asrani as Raghunath, Chhenu's team mate
Danny Denzongpa as Sanju
Yogesh Chhabra as Pandey part of Shatrughan Sinha’s team
Paintal as Bansi
Dinesh Thakur as Billoo
Sudhir Thakkar as Ranbir
Ramesh Deo as Arun Gupta
Sumita Sanyal as Lata
Mehmood as Sri Anokhelal
Asit Sen as Biloki Prasad
Abhi Bhattacharya as Freedom Fighter
Leela Mishra as Gupta's maidservant
Shashi Kiran as Neelu
Keshto Mukherjee as Jattu
Dev Kishan as Shyam's father
A. K. Hangal as College Principal
Yogeeta Bali as Urmila
Kamaldeep as Urmila's father (as Kamal Deep)
Fatima as Julie
Amina Karim as Young Anandi

Production
After Apanjan, directed by Tapan Sinha, is based on a story of Inder Mitra, was both a commercial and critical success. Screenwriter Gulzar was called to Kolkata to translate the script for a Hindi remake. However, subsequently Sinha insisted on using the same cast, and dropped out of the film. Then, Gulzar, who till then was assisting Bimal Roy and Hrishikesh Mukherjee and penned screenplays of  Khamoshi (1969) and Anand (1971), made his directorial debut with the film. Gulzar bought the rights of the story, and rewrote the screenplay removing the portions he felt were too formulaic and commercial. 

Gulzar, in an interview revealed that N. C. Sippy, the producer of the film, wanted actress Nimmi in the grandmother's role. Gulzar however was keen on Chhaya Devi, who played that role in the original. It was Meena Kumari who was finally given the role of grandmother on Gulzar and Romu Sippy's insistence. Kumari who was ailing at the time, worked through her bad health in the film. The shooting was completed in 40 days. 
Only the song, Chand Katora Liye Bhikaran... couldn't be picturised on Kumari as she was in no condition to come to the sets, being on the last stage of her illness. Mere Apne was the last film she shot for and would often joke with the young actors, 'This director is pushing you so hard, at least you can ask him to host you a beer party'. However, that party never happened as she died soon after the release of the film.

Soundtrack

References

Bibliography

External links 
 
 

1971 films
1970s Hindi-language films
Hindi remakes of Bengali films
Films scored by Salil Chowdhury
Films directed by Gulzar
1971 directorial debut films